South Allegheny School District is a suburban, public school district located in Allegheny County, Pennsylvania. It serves the Pittsburgh suburbs of Port Vue, Liberty, Glassport, and Lincoln. South Allegheny School District encompasses approximately 9 square miles. According to 2000 federal census data, it serves a resident population of 13,109. In 2009 the district residents' Per capita income was $16,590, while the median family income was $38,949.

Schools
South Allegheny Middle/Senior High School
South Allegheny Elementary School
South Allegheny Early Childhood Center

References

External links
 

School districts in Allegheny County, Pennsylvania
Education in Pittsburgh area
School districts established in 1966